Abo is an unincorporated community in eastern Laclede County, in the Ozarks of south central Missouri. The community is located on the east bank of the Osage Fork Gasconade River, approximately ten miles east of Lebanon.

History
A post office called Abo was established in 1893, and remained in operation until 1940. The name may be a transfer from Abo, in New Mexico.

In 1925, Abo had 25 inhabitants.

References

Unincorporated communities in Laclede County, Missouri
Unincorporated communities in Missouri